Oscar Lewis, born Lefkowitz (December 25, 1914 – December 16, 1970) was an American anthropologist. He is best known for his vivid depictions of the lives of slum dwellers and his argument that a cross-generational culture of poverty transcends national boundaries. Lewis contended that the cultural similarities occurred because they were "common adaptations to common problems" and that "the culture of poverty is both an adaptation and a reaction of the poor classes to their marginal position in a class-stratified, highly individualistic, capitalistic society." 
He won the 1967 U.S. National Book Award in Science, Philosophy and Religion for La vida: a Puerto Rican family in the culture of poverty--San Juan and New York.

Early life and education 
Lewis was the son of a rabbi, born 1914 in New York City and raised on a small farm in upstate New York. He received a bachelor's degree in history in 1936 from City College of New York, where he met his future wife and research associate, Ruth Maslow. As a graduate student at Columbia University, he became dissatisfied with the History Department at Columbia. At the suggestion of his brother-in-law, Abraham Maslow, Lewis had a conversation with Ruth Benedict of the Anthropology Department. He switched departments and then received a Ph.D. in anthropology from Columbia in 1940. His Ph.D. dissertation on the effects of contact with white people on the Blackfeet Indians was published in 1942.

Career 
Lewis taught at Brooklyn College, and Washington University in St. Louis, and helped to found the anthropology department at the University of Illinois Urbana-Champaign. His most controversial book was ‘La Vida’ that chronicled the life of Puerto Rican prostitute, living with her sixth husband, who was raising her children in conditions unimaginable to many middle-class American readers.  He died in New York City of heart failure, at age 55 in 1970, and was buried in New Montefiore Cemetery in West Babylon, Suffolk County, New York.

Books
 High Sierra Country, 1955
 Five Families; Mexican Case Studies in the Culture of Poverty, 1959
 Life in a Mexican Village; Tepoztlán restudied, 1960 [first edition 1951]
 The Children of Sanchez, Autobiography of a Mexican Family, 1961
 Pedro Martinez - A Mexican Peasant and His Family, 1964
 La Vida; A Puerto Rican Family in the Culture of Poverty—San Juan and New York, 1966
 A Death in the Sánchez Family, 1969
 Village Life in Northern India

References

External links
 Oscar Lewis at Library of Congress Authorities — with 18 catalog records

1914 births
1970 deaths
Columbia Graduate School of Arts and Sciences alumni
National Book Award winners
Brooklyn College faculty
Washington University in St. Louis faculty
University of Illinois Urbana-Champaign faculty
City College of New York alumni
Scientists from New York City
20th-century American anthropologists